The Spanish autonomous community of Castile and León does not have a legally established capital city.

The region's 1983 statute of autonomy did not name a capital. The articles referred only to the "seat of government", that could only be fixed with a two-thirds approval in the Cortes of Castile and León. In 1987, President of the Junta of Castile and León José María Aznar approved that the basic bodies of regional rule – the presidency, Junta and the Cortes – would be located in Valladolid.

One reason for the lack of the official capital is that the merger of Castile and León as one autonomous community caused uproar in the latter, which wanted to be separate. Other autonomous bodies are in the capitals of other provinces of the region. The High Court of Justice of Castile and León is in Burgos, the Court of Audits is in Palencia, the Advisory Council is in Zamora, the Ombudsman is in León.

In March 2009, the Junta of Castile and León apologised for textbooks that named Valladolid as capital, saying that it was an honest confusion of its status as a seat. In February 2010, the People's Party in Valladolid City Hall rejected a Spanish Socialist Workers' Party proposal for the city to become the official capital, saying it could "provoke eight motions against it" from the other provincial capitals. In September 2019, José Antonio de Santiago Juárez of Valladolid's PP made a proposal of the same matter, which was opposed by the party leadership.

References

Further reading

Government of Castile and León